Ross McLellan (born 20 February 1955) is an Australian cricketer. He played in three first-class matches for South Australia between 1979 and 1982.

See also
 List of South Australian representative cricketers

References

External links
 

1955 births
Living people
Australian cricketers
South Australia cricketers
Cricketers from Melbourne
People from Glen Huntly, Victoria